Erythroxylum sechellarum is a species of plant in the Erythroxylaceae family. It is endemic to Seychelles.

References

sechellarum
Endemic flora of Seychelles
Vulnerable flora of Africa
Taxonomy articles created by Polbot
Plants described in 1907